This is the list of newspapers currently being published in the Philippines. This list includes broadsheets and tabloids published daily and distributed nationwide. Regional newspapers or those published in the regions are also included. Almost all broadsheets published and distributed nationwide are in English. Most tabloids are published in Tagalog.

Broadsheets

Online only

Tabloids

Regional and community newspapers

Foreign-language newspapers

Spanish
 e-Dyario
 La Jornada Filipina
 Semanario de Filipinas
 Revista Filipina

Mandarin Chinese
 Chinese Commercial News (菲律賓商報)
 Philippine Chinese Daily (菲律賓華報)
 Sino-Fil Daily (菲華日報)
 Ta Kung Pao - Philippine edition (大公報 - 菲律賓版)
 United Daily News (聯合日報)
 Wen Wei Po - Philippine edition (文匯報 - 菲律賓版)
 World News (世界日報)

Japanese
 Manila Shimbun

Korean 
 Ilyo Sinmun
 Manila Seoul
 News Gate
 Weekly Manila

References

Further reading
 

Philippines
 
Newspapers